Joseph Deville Thomas Galibardy (10 January 1915 – 17 May 2011) was an Indian field hockey player who competed in the 1936 Summer Olympics.

In 1936 he was a member of the Indian field hockey team, which won the gold medal. He played five matches as halfback.

Galibardy was born in Madras and received his school education from Goethals Memorial School, Kurseong in India. He visited his alma-mater, when Goethals celebrated its centenary in the year 2007 at the age of 93. Goethals Memorial School is also the alma-mater of his teammate Cyril Michie. Galibardy moved to England in 1956 and lived in Walthamstow, London at the time of his death. He was the last surviving member of the 1936 Indian field hockey team that won the gold medal.

References

External links

August 2007 update

1915 births
2011 deaths
Field hockey players from Chennai
Olympic field hockey players of India
Field hockey players at the 1936 Summer Olympics
Indian male field hockey players
Olympic gold medalists for India
Anglo-Indian people
Olympic medalists in field hockey
Medalists at the 1936 Summer Olympics
Indian emigrants to England
British people of Anglo-Indian descent